Apteropeda orbiculata is a species of beetle in the Chrysomelidae family that can be found on the British Isles, Denmark, France, Germany, Northern Spain, the Netherlands, Western Poland and Western Ukraine. It is black coloured, but can also be green.

Habitat
The species feeds on various plants, including Ajuga, Aster, Cirsium, Galeopsis, Linaria, Mullein, Plantago, Polyphagus, Primula, Rhinanthus, Scrophularia, Stachys, and Veronica species.

References

Galerucinae
Beetles described in 1802
Beetles of Europe
Taxa named by Thomas Marsham